Max Valles (born August 5, 1994) is a former American football defensive end. He played college football at Virginia. He was drafted by the Oakland Raiders in the sixth round of the 2015 NFL Draft.

Early years
Valles grew up in the Sicklerville section of Winslow Township, New Jersey and played high school football at St. Joseph High School in Hammonton, New Jersey, where he played wide receiver, defensive end and safety. Valles committed to the University of Virginia to play college football. He also played baseball in high school. After high school, he attended Fork Union Military Academy for a year.

College career
Valles attended Virginia from 2013 to 2014. As a freshman in 2013, he played in 10 games, making four starts. He had 23 tackles and four sacks. Valles started all 12 games as a sophomore in 2014. He finished the year with 55 tackles and nine sacks.

After his redshirt sophomore season, Valles entered the 2015 NFL Draft.

Professional career

Oakland Raiders
Valles was selected with the 179th overall pick of the 2015 NFL Draft by the Oakland Raiders, who announced he would play defensive end. On September 5, 2015, he was waived by the Raiders and was re-signed to the practice squad.

Buffalo Bills
On December 16, 2015, the Buffalo Bills signed Valles off the Raiders' practice squad.

On September 2, 2016, he was released by the Bills as part of final roster cuts and was re-signed to the practice squad. He signed a reserve/future contract with the Bills on January 2, 2017.

On September 2, 2017, Valles was waived by the Bills.

Oakland Raiders (second stint)
Valles was signed to the Raiders' practice squad on September 3 and was released on September 8, 2017. He was re-signed on September 12, 2017. He was released on September 28, 2017.

Ottawa Redblacks
On May 21, 2019, Valles signed with the Ottawa Redblacks of the Canadian Football League.

Personal life
His older brother, Hakeem, also played in the NFL.

References

External links
Virginia Cavaliers bio

1994 births
Living people
People from Winslow Township, New Jersey
St. Joseph Academy (New Jersey) alumni
Players of American football from New Jersey
Sportspeople from Camden County, New Jersey
American football linebackers
Virginia Cavaliers football players
Oakland Raiders players
Buffalo Bills players